Bingley is a town in West Yorkshire, England, near Bradford.

Bingley may also refer to:

Places
Bingley (ward), an electoral division based on Bingley
Bingley, Alberta, a locality in Canada

People
Bingley (surname)
Baron Bingley
Robert Benson, 1st Baron Bingley (1676–1731)
George Fox-Lane, 1st Baron Bingley (1697–1773)
George Lane-Fox, 1st Baron Bingley (1871–1947)
 Charles Bingley, a character in the novel Pride and Prejudice

Other uses
Bingley Grammar School
Bingley railway station

See also
Bingley Hall, Birmingham, England
The Bingley Arms, pub in Leeds, England